Balen is a municipality located in the Belgian province of Antwerp. The municipality comprises the towns of Balen proper and Olmen. In 2021, Balen had a population of 22,853. Total area is 72.88 km².

Famous inhabitants
 Tom Boonen, World Cycling Champion in 2005.

Gallery

Climate

References

External links
 
Official website - Information available in Dutch and some information available in English

 
Municipalities of Antwerp Province
Populated places in Antwerp Province